VfL Wolfsburg  is a German association football club based in Wolfsburg, Lower Saxony. The club was founded in 1945, as VSK Wolfsburg, growing out of a multi-sports club for Volkswagen workers in the city of Wolfsburg. Men's professional football is run by the spin-off organization VfL Wolfsburg-Fußball GmbH, a wholly owned subsidiary of the Volkswagen Group. VfL Wolfsburg plays its home matches at the Volkswagen Arena.

History
Having finished as sixth place in 1999 in the German top flight, Wolfsburg gained entry to continental football for the first time, specifically the 1999–2000 UEFA Cup, where they fell in the third round against Atlético Madrid. They also qualified for the UEFA Intertoto Cup in 2000, 2001, 2003, 2004 and 2005, enjoying their best run in 2003 after reaching the final in which they lost to Italian side Perugia.

In the 2008–09 season, Wolfsburg won their maiden Bundesliga title, thus qualifying for the UEFA Champions League for the first time in their history. They came third in their group, behind Manchester United and CSKA Moscow, losing the chance for a place in the competition's successive round. As a result, they qualified for the Round of 32 phase of the UEFA Europa League. They defeated Spanish side Villarreal 6–3 on aggregate and Russian champions Rubin Kazan 3–2. In the quarter-finals, however, they were beaten 3–1 by eventual finalists Fulham.

Their best performance in Europe was during the 2015–16 season, when they reached the quarter-finals of the Champions League after passing through a group with Manchester United, CSKA Moscow and PSV Eindhoven, and beating Gent in the round of 32. They faced Spanish giants Real Madrid, winning the first leg on Volkswagen Arena 2–0, only to lose the return leg in Santiago Bernabéu 0–3.

Matches

Overall record

By competition

By club

By country

References

External links 
UEFA Profile - Wolfsburg

VfL Wolfsburg
German football clubs in international competitions